John Bailey (born 29 October 1941) is a New Zealand cricketer. He played in four first-class matches for Northern Districts in 1965/66.

See also
 List of Northern Districts representative cricketers

References

External links
 

1941 births
Living people
New Zealand cricketers
Northern Districts cricketers
Cricketers from Preston, Lancashire